"Out of Sight" is a funk song recorded by James Brown in 1964. A twelve-bar blues written by Brown under the pseudonym "Ted Wright", the stuttering, staccato dance rhythms and blasting horn section riffs of its instrumental arrangement were an important evolutionary step in the development of funk music.

Composition
In his 1986 autobiography Brown wrote that

"Out of Sight" was another beginning, musically and professionally. My music - and most music - changed with "Papa's Got a Brand New Bag", but it really started on "Out of Sight" ... You can hear the band and me start to move in a whole other direction rhythmically. The horns, the guitars, the vocals, everything was starting to be used to establish all kinds of rhythms at once... I was trying to get every aspect of the production to contribute to the rhythmic patterns.

"Out of Sight" was the third single Brown recorded for Smash Records in the midst of a contract dispute with his main label, King. A significant pop hit, it reached #24 on the Billboard Hot 100, and #5 on the Cashbox R&B chart. (Billboard had temporarily suspended its R&B listings at the time.) It was also the last song he would record for over a year, as the court's ruling in his dispute with King barred him from making vocal recordings for Smash.

"Out of Sight" was one of Brown's first recordings to feature the playing of saxophonist Maceo Parker. Its B-side, "Maybe the Last Time", was his last studio recording with the Famous Flames. Besides its single release, "Out of Sight" appeared on an album of the same name, which was quickly withdrawn from sale. It was re-released on King in 1968 with one track missing under the title James Brown Sings Out of Sight.

Reception
Bruce Springsteen described the song as, "Pure excitement, pure electricity, pure 'get out of your seat, move your ass'. Pure sweat-filled, gospel-filled raw, rock and roll, rhythm and blues. It's like a taut rubber band."

Other recordings
Performances of "Out of Sight" appear on the album Live at the Garden and in the concert film T.A.M.I. Show.

Cover versions
 Van Morrison and Them covered "Out of Sight" on their 1966 album Them Again.
 Billy Vera performs the song on the 1989 album Soul Session Live.

Personnel
 James Brown - lead vocal

with the James Brown Band:
 McKinley "Mack" Johnson - trumpet
 Ron Tooley - trumpet
 Robert Knight - trumpet
 Joe Dupars - trumpet
 Wilmer Milton - trombone
 Nat Jones - alto saxophone
 Eldee Williams - tenor saxophone
 St. Clair Pinckney - tenor saxophone
 Al "Brisco" Clark - tenor saxophone
 Maceo Parker - baritone saxophone
 Lucas "Fats" Gonder or Bobby Byrd - organ
 Les Buie - guitar
 Bernard Odum - bass
 Melvin Parker - drums

References

External links
 AllMusic review

James Brown songs
1964 singles
Funk songs
Van Morrison songs
Songs written by James Brown
1964 songs
Smash Records singles